Bletia purpurata is a species of orchid widespread across much of Mexico and Central America, from Nicaragua to Tamaulipas, Sinaloa and Baja California Sur.

References

External links 
Line drawing for Flora of Panama, Bletia purpurata
Conabio, NaturaLista, Bletia purpurata, un miembro de Orquídeas 
Lista de orquídeas mexicanas, Bletia purpurata
Swiss Orchid Foundation at the Herbarium Jany Renz, Bletia purpurata A. Rich. & Galeotti
Herbario Zamorano, Bletia purpurata

purpurata
Plants described in 1798
Orchids of Mexico
Orchids of Central America